Olds College of Agriculture & Technology is an Alberta public post-secondary institution located in Olds, Alberta, established in 1913 as Olds Agricultural College.

Total student enrollment for the 2020–2021 academic year was 5446.

The college is a member of the Alberta Rural Development Network.

History
In the year 1911, Olds College was operating as a provincially funded demonstration farm. On November 21, 1913 it opened as the Olds School of Agriculture and Home Economics, with W.J. Elliot as the principal. Students studied field husbandry, farm mechanics and domestic science. In addition, the provincial administration of the college was moved from the Ministry of Agriculture to the Ministry of Advanced Education at that time. In 2022, Olds College rebranded as Olds College of Agriculture & Technology.

Campus

Olds College of Agriculture & Technology is located on the eastern edge of the township of Olds. The campus covers over  including farmland in Didsbury, Carstairs, and Saskatchewan. 

The Agriculture Learning Hub, opened in 2022, is home to the Werklund School of Ag Technology. These programs include Ag Management Diploma, Bachelor of Applied Science; Agribusiness, Precision Ag Techgronomy Diploma, and Land & Water Resources Diploma.

Construction on the Animal Health Education Centre, due to be complete in 2022, will host the National Meat Training Centre and Retail Store, and the Animal Health Technology program, including housing facilities for small animals, and research and veterinary facilities.

The Land Sciences building is connected to the Greenhouses and Landscape Pavilion and features classrooms, typically in use by Horticulture and Land & Environment Classes, as well as offices for faculty in those programs. Here students can specialize in programs like Environmental Stewardship & Rural Planning, Land Reclamation & Remediation, and Surface Land Management Majors.

The highlight of the Land Sciences Building is the atrium, a glass seating area filled with vegetation. 

The Fine Arts Theatre opened in late 2008. The facility offers a 350+ seat theatre which is used for community events, high school drama productions and more. This building is offered in partnership between Olds College and Chinook's Edge School Division.

On-Campus residence includes Centennial Village featuring 450 student rooms and College Courts which feature 45 4-Bedroom Townhouses with kitchens.

The Library Research Commons (LRC) is home to the Library, Alumni Centre, Campus Store, Students’ Association offices, and the Bell E-Learning Centre
The campus is also home to the Botanic Gardens and Treatment Wetlands and two riding arenas.

Curriculum and degrees
Olds College of Agriculture & Technology offers 35 programs. They are authorized by the Government of Alberta to grant certificates, diplomas, Bachelor of Applied Science Degrees and Apprenticeship designations.

In Fall 2023, the new Bachelor of Digital Agriculture Degree will launch. This four-year program will immerse students in global challenges in agriculture exploring solutions using digital agriculture technologies and practices.

Scholarships and bursaries
Olds College offers over 475 scholarships, bursaries and awards annually, valued at over $555,000.

The Government of Canada sponsors an Aboriginal Bursaries Search Tool that lists over 680 scholarships, bursaries, and other incentives offered by governments, universities, and industry to support Aboriginal post-secondary participation. Olds College scholarships for Aboriginal, First Nations and Métis students include: TransAlta Aboriginal Educational Awards.

Research
The Olds College Centre for Innovation (OCCI) is the applied research division of Olds College. Olds College actively pursues involvement in applied research that advances innovation-based rural economic development in Alberta.

The mandate of Olds College Centre for Innovation is to enhance innovation in the agriculture, horticulture, land and environmental management sectors through market-focused applied research and the development of enabling processes and new products

The Prairie Turfgrass Research Centre is a long-standing joint partnership between the Olds College Centre for Innovation (OCCI) and the industry-led Alberta Turfgrass Research Foundation (ATRF). The PTRC conducts research and disseminates information regarding the management of turfgrass on the Canadian prairies.

Athletics
The Olds College Broncos compete in the ACAC Alberta Colleges Athletic Conference; sports include: basketball, women's hockey, soccer, volleyball,and futsal. The Broncos have one CCAA national championship gold medal to their name, in women's basketball in 2019.

Community Learning Campus
The Community Learning Campus (CLC) is a partnership approach to collaboratively delivering high school, post-secondary, and community education.  The CLC addresses specific rural needs by sharing resources and working jointly with a variety of community groups and agencies.  The CLC is a joint venture between Olds College and Chinook's Edge School Division (CESD) in collaboration with the Town of Olds, Mountain View County, and the University of Alberta.  Integrated with the Olds College Campus, the CLC consists of five multi-use facilities complete with integrated programming.

Ralph Klein Centre is home to the Community Learning Campus, The CLC Fitness Centre, the Olds High School, and also has government administration offices. The facility was named after the late Ralph Klein, former premier of Alberta. The Ralph Klein Centre is also home to the Olds College Broncos, where they host the majority of their games.

Notable people
Sharon Carry served as registrar and vice president of student and support services at Olds College.

See also
List of agricultural universities and colleges
Education in Alberta
List of universities and colleges in Alberta
Canadian Colleges Athletic Association

References

External links 
 Olds College

Colleges in Alberta
Agricultural universities and colleges in Canada
Educational institutions established in 1913
1913 establishments in Alberta